Kaori Kato (born 26 July 1977) is a former Japanese cricketer who played five Women's One Day International cricket matches for Japan national women's cricket team in 2003. She captained the side in their matches during the 2003 IWCC Trophy, which served as a qualification competition for the 2005 World Cup.

References

1977 births
Living people
Japanese women cricketers
Japanese women cricket captains